Gümüşhacıköy is a town in the westernmost part of Amasya Province of Turkey, 20 km from the larger town of Merzifon. It is the seat of Gümüşhacıköy District. Its population is 14,582 (2021). The mayor is Zehra Özyol (CHP).

The name Gümüşhacıköy is an amalgamation of two separate villages Gümüş (silver) and  Hacıköy (the village of pilgrims).

Climate
Gümüşhacıköy has a warm-summer Mediterranean climate (Köppen: Csb).

History
The town achieved some prosperity during the 13th and 14th centuries due to the nearby silver mines. Both the Seljuks and the Ilkhans minted coins in the town, then known as Gümüşbazar.

The town grew and continued to thrive under Ottoman rule. The population shrank as the Ottoman Empire collapsed, and many men of Gümüşhacıköy were lost in the Balkan Wars and the First World War.

Today Gümüşhacıköy is a small town in attractive countryside. Successive generations migrate to larger cities in search of careers leaving an aging and shrinking population behind.

Places of interest
 The town has had a rich history and the many Seljuk and Ottoman buildings include urban architecture such as Bedestan (the covered bazaar), Büyük hamam (Turkish bath), and Kabak çeşmesi (fountain) and especially.....
 Mosques such as Haliliye Medresesi, Yörgüç Paşa Camii, Darphane Camii, Maden Camii (a converted church).
 There is also an attractive picnic area with a waterfall in the forests near the district of Şarlayuk.

References

Populated places in Amasya Province
Towns in Turkey
Gümüşhacıköy District